Slivna is a settlement west of Vače in the Municipality of Litija in central Slovenia. The area is part of the traditional region of Upper Carniola. It is now included with the rest of the municipality in the Central Sava Statistical Region. The settlement is the Geometric Centre of the Republic of Slovenia.

Church

The local church, built in the hamlet of Zgornja Slivna, is dedicated to Saint Agnes and belongs to the Parish of Vače. It is a late 14th-century church that was restyled in the Baroque in the late 17th to early 18th centuries.

References

External links

Slivna on Geopedia

Populated places in the Municipality of Litija